The 2017 Wrocław Open was a professional tennis tournament played on indoor hard courts. It was the third edition of the tournament which was part of the 2017 ATP Challenger Tour. It took place in Wrocław, Poland between 27 February and 5 March 2017.

Singles main-draw entrants

Seeds

 1 Rankings as of February 20, 2017.

Other entrants
The following players received wildcards into the singles main draw:
  Michał Dembek
  Hubert Hurkacz
  Michał Przysiężny
  Kacper Żuk

The following player received entry into the singles main draw as an alternate:
  Sebastian Ofner

The following player received entry into the singles main draw using a protected ranking:
  Jürgen Melzer

The following player received entry into the singles main draw using a special exemption:
  Quentin Halys

The following players received entry from the qualifying draw:
  Marek Jaloviec
  Andriej Kapaś
  Yann Marti
  Mats Moraing

Champions

Singles

 Jürgen Melzer def.  Michał Przysiężny, 6–4, 6–3

Doubles

 Adil Shamasdin /  Andrei Vasilevski def.  Mikhail Elgin /  Denys Molchanov, 6–3, 3–6, [21–19]

External links
 Official Website

Wroclaw Open
Wrocław Open
Wroc